Hamilton Emilio Cuvi Rivera (born May 8, 1960) is a retired footballer from Ecuador, who played as a midfielder during his career.

Ecuador

1983-1989 Ecuador

Personal Titles
Top Scorer with Filanbanco in 1987 (24 Goals) (Ecuador)
Scorer with 147 Goals in Ecuador "Serie A"

References

External links
 
 
 
 Ecuador Top Scorers at es.wikipedia.org 
 El Universo Newspaper from Ecuador 

1960 births
Living people
People from Milagro, Ecuador
Association football midfielders
Ecuadorian footballers
Ecuador international footballers
1987 Copa América players
1989 Copa América players
L.D.U. Portoviejo footballers
S.D. Aucas footballers
Delfín S.C. footballers